The Boötes Void (colloquially referred to as the Great Nothing) is an approximately spherical region of space found in the vicinity of the constellation Boötes, containing very few galaxies, hence its name. It is enormous, with a radius of 62 megaparsecs. Its centre is located at approximately right ascension  and declination .

Description
At nearly 330 million light-years in diameter (approximately 0.27% of the diameter of the observable Universe), or nearly 236,000 Mpc3 in volume, the Boötes Void is one of the largest known voids in the Universe, and is referred to as a supervoid. Its discovery was reported by Robert Kirshner et al. (1981) as part of a survey of galactic redshifts. The centre of the Boötes Void is approximately 700 million light-years from Earth.

Other astronomers soon discovered that the void contains a few galaxies. In 1987, J. Moody, Robert P. Kirshner, G. MacAlpine, and S. Gregory published their findings of eight galaxies in the void. M. Strauss and John Huchra announced the discovery of three more galaxies in 1988, and Greg Aldering, G. Bothun, Robert P. Kirshner, and Ron Marzke announced the discovery of fifteen galaxies in 1989. By 1997, the Boötes Void was known to contain 60 galaxies in a space that would usually roughly have 2000. 

According to astronomer Greg Aldering, the scale of the void is such that "If the Milky Way had been in the centre of the Boötes Void, we wouldn't have known there were other galaxies until the 1960s."

The Hercules Supercluster forms part of the near edge of the void.

Origins

There are no major apparent inconsistencies between the existence of the Boötes Void and the Lambda-CDM model of cosmological evolution.
It has been theorized that the Boötes Void was formed from the merging of smaller voids, much like the way in which soap bubbles coalesce to form larger bubbles. This would account for the small number of galaxies that populate a roughly tube-shaped region running through the middle of the void.

Confusion with Barnard 68
The Boötes Void has been often associated with images of Barnard 68, a dark nebula that does not allow light to pass through; however, the images of Barnard 68 are much darker than those observed of the Boötes Void, as the nebula is much closer and there are fewer stars in front of it, as well as its being a physical mass that blocks light passing through.

See also
 List of largest voids
 Baryon acoustic oscillations

Footnotes

References
 
 

Voids (astronomy)
Boötes